The Pennsylvania Railroad (PRR) K4 4-6-2 "Pacific" (425 built 1914–1928, PRR Altoona, Baldwin) was its premier passenger-hauling steam locomotive from 1914 through the end of steam on the PRR in 1957.

Attempts were made to replace the K4s, including the K5 and the T1 duplex locomotive, but neither was very successful. The K4s hauled the vast majority of express passenger trains until they were replaced by diesel locomotives. The K4s were not powerful enough for the heavier trains they often pulled from the mid-1930s onward, so they were often double- or even triple-headed, sometimes with atlantic class locomotives. This was effective, but expensive, and several crews were needed. The PRR did have the extra locomotives, many having been displaced by electrification east of Harrisburg.

The two preserved K4s Nos. 1361 and 3750 were designated as Pennsylvania's official state steam locomotives on December 18, 1987, when Pennsylvania Governor Robert P. Casey signed into law House Bill No. 1211.

Development

The K4s was designed under the supervision of PRR Chief of Motive Power J.T. Wallis, assisted by Chief Mechanical Engineer Alfred W. Gibbs and Mechanical Engineer Axel Vogt, as one of a pair of classes with the L1s 2-8-2 "Mikado", sharing a boiler and other features. Some inspiration came from the large experimental K29s Pacific built in 1911 by the American Locomotive Company. Also influential was Gibbs' design for the successful E6 4-4-2 "Atlantics", from which the K4s inherited its heat-treated, lightweight machinery, its cast-steel KW trailing truck and much of its appearance.

The K4s design increased grate area from previous classes' . The boiler barrel was fatter than previous classes, and the increase in heating surface and boiler size gave the class good steam-generating capability. Equipment on the prototype, built in 1914, was conservative and included a screw reverse (power reverse would soon be added); a small 70-P-70 tender holding only  of water and 12½ tons of coal, set up for hand-firing; a wooden cowcatcher pilot; a square-cased, old-fashioned headlight and piston tailrods (soon to go).

The K4s design was successful enough that it influenced other locomotive designs, and not only those of other PRR locomotives. London and North Eastern Railway Chief Mechanical Engineer Nigel Gresley incorporated much of the boiler design (including the tapered shape) into his famous Class A1 Pacific. 

A World War I-era prototype had distinctive "chicken coop" slat pilots, while the postwar versions had modern pilots.

Production
Three years elapsed until production examples were built. Partly, this was due to extensive testing, but wartime necessitated priority in construction to the L1s Mikado type for freight. In 1917, Altoona's Juniata Shops started producing K4s in numbers. The first 168 carried widely scattered road numbers, traditional for the PRR, but subsequent locomotives produced after 1920 were numbered in consecutive blocks.

Numbers 5400–5474 were built by Baldwin, while all others were constructed at the PRR's Juniata Shops.

Modifications
The PRR experimented extensively with its K4s fleet, trying out streamlining, poppet valves, smoke deflectors, driving wheel types and others.

Streamlining
A number of K4 locomotives had streamlining applied over the years, to varying degrees. All were later removed, restoring the locomotives to their original appearance.

No. 3768

Locomotive #3768 was clad in a shroud designed by famed industrial designer Raymond Loewy in February 1936. This was a very concealing, enveloping streamlined casing which hid most of the functionality of the steam locomotive, leading to its nickname of "The Torpedo" by train crews. Clay models of Loewy's design streamlined K4s and conventional K4s were tested in a wind tunnel for smoke-lifting ability by Alexander Klemin of the Daniel Guggenheim School of Aeronautics of New York University (CMP). Of 24 variations, 4 were chosen for wind tunnel tests to determine the final design.

At first, the locomotive was not painted in standard Dark Green Locomotive Enamel (DGLE) but instead in a bronze color. It was later refinished in DGLE. A matching tender ran on unusual six-wheel trucks. Like most streamlined steam locomotives, the shrouds impeded maintenance and the covers over the wheels were later removed. For a time, the locomotive was the preferred engine for the Broadway Limited.

The 3768 can be seen in action in the 1945 film, The Great Flamarion.
The 3768 renumbered as 3763 can be seen in the film Broadway Limited.

Nos. 1120, 2665, 3678, and 5338

These four locomotives were streamlined in 1940 and 1941 with simpler, closer-fitting casings that hid less of the steam locomotives' workings, In that sense, they were similar to Henry Dreyfuss's casings for NYC Hudsons. According to an interview of John W. Epstein, Special Projects Manager and vice president, Raymond Loewy & Assoc., these four streamlined K4s were designed by Raymond Loewy but, due to WWII, there was no publicity about it. PRR #1120 and #2665 were streamlined in 1940 for the South Wind, a named passenger train equipped and operated jointly by the Pennsylvania Railroad, the Louisville and Nashville Railroad, the Atlantic Coast Line Railroad (later Seaboard Coast Line) and the Florida East Coast Railway. The South Wind began operations in December 1940, providing streamliner service between Chicago, Illinois and Miami, Florida.

PRR No. 3678 and No. 5338 were streamlined in 1941 for The Jeffersonian, one of the PRR's premier, all-coach trains between New York and St. Louis. They were also seen hauling the Broadway Limited (New York to Chicago), Liberty Limited (Washington to Chicago), and the Trail Blazer (New York to Chicago) occasionally. During World War II, these four locomotives formed a streamlined steam engine fleet within the PRR system, with another five locomotives that were also designed by noted industrial designer Raymond Loewy; they were the PRR S1 #6100, PRR Q1#6130, T1's #6110 and #6111; and K4s #3768. Streamlined shrouding of these four K4s Pacific locomotives was removed after 1950, together with PRR K4s #3678.

No. 1188
K4s #1188 was given a boiler-top streamlined "skyline" casing, but no other streamlining, and was nicknamed "The Skyline".
The bell was preserved as well.

Other modifications

Cross-counterbalanced disc drivers
K4s 5484 was refitted with cross-counterbalanced disc drivers.

"Elephant Ear" smoke deflectors
K4s 5038 was given "elephant ear" smoke deflectors and a shroud for the smokestack, the use of which were uncommon for the PRR system.

Boosters
K4s numbers 3676, 5399, and 5436 were fitted with booster engines on the trailing trucks in 1941.

Roller bearings
K4s numbers 20 and 5371 were fitted with roller bearings.

Poppet valves
K4s 5399 was rebuilt by Lima in 1939, with, among other improvements, poppet valves actuated by Franklin oscillating cams. K4s 5436 was fitted with stem-actuated valves in 1940. They were designed by Lloyd Jones, Engineer of Tests at the Altoona Works. In 1945, K4s 3847 was given a front-end throttle and Franklin rotary-actuated poppet valves. All performed well, but were difficult to maintain.

K4sa
K4s numbers 612, 1985, 5405, 5481 and 5484 were converted with 15" piston valves, higher steam domes and circulators, and front-end throttles, and were re-classed as K4sa.

Preservation
There are only two surviving K4s class locomotives:
No. 3750 sits on outdoor static display at the Railroad Museum of Pennsylvania, outside Strasburg, Pennsylvania. The museum's volunteer group plans to have No. 3750 cosmetically restored prior to it being placed in the newly proposed roundhouse exhibit.

No. 1361 was being restored to operating condition by the Railroaders Memorial Museum in Altoona in 1987, but persistent bearing problems ended its operation the following year. The locomotive was moved to the Steamtown National Historic Site and the boiler moved to the East Broad Top shops. The disassembled locomotive lay in pieces for 22 years before the project was officially abandoned in 2010. The Museum cited changes in FRA safety standards and new limits to mainline railway access that would make operation impractical. 
In May 2018, a group of preservationists, engineers and financial backers initiated a new restoration study.  The work would include a detailed assessment of the engineering needs and a sustainable operating plan. 
The group plans to replicate a 1940s Pennsylvania Railroad passenger train. It would work with the state's educators to give rides at tourist railroads within the state to school children on field trips, thus educating them on the history of how the Pennsylvania Railroad shaped their state.

On June 25, 2021, the Railroaders Memorial Museum in Altoona announced that it would launch a complete $2.6 million restoration of #1361. The Museum Chairman is Charles "Wick" Moorman, retired Chairman and CEO of Norfolk Southern Railway, and its Board includes Henry Posner III, President of Railroad Development Corporation of Pittsburgh, head of the Posner Foundation and well-known venture capitalist. As of December 2022, a new Belpaire firebox was nearing completion, although with thicker steel and other modifications of the 1914 design in order to comply with current federal safety requirements.

In fiction
The Thomas & Friends character Hank is based on the K4 locomotive.

References

Further reading

External links
 The Pennsylvania Railroad Pacifics at SteamLocomotive.com.
 PRR Steam Roster Pt6 - Class K.
 K4s - All of them! by Gary Mittner.
 PRR K4s Pacific By Bill Klene & Steve Lerro

K4s
Baldwin locomotives
4-6-2 locomotives
Railway locomotives introduced in 1914
Steam locomotives of the United States
Streamlined steam locomotives
Passenger locomotives
Standard gauge locomotives of the United States